The 2000–01 Albanian National Championship was the 62nd season of the Albanian National Championship, the top professional league for association football clubs, since its establishment in 1930.

Teams

Stadia and last season

League table

Results

Season statistics

Top scorers

Notes

References

Kategoria Superiore seasons
1
Albanian Superliga